The twentieth season of British science fiction television series Doctor Who began on 3 January 1983 with the story Arc of Infinity, and ended 16 March 1983 with The King's Demons. A 20th Anniversary special, The Five Doctors, followed in November 1983. John Nathan-Turner produced this series, with Eric Saward script editing.

Casting

Main cast 
 Peter Davison as the Fifth Doctor
 Sarah Sutton as Nyssa
 Janet Fielding as Tegan Jovanka
 Mark Strickson as Vislor Turlough
 Gerald Flood as Voice of Kamelion
 Richard Hurndall as the First Doctor
 Patrick Troughton as the Second Doctor
 Jon Pertwee as the Third Doctor
 Carole Ann Ford as Susan Foreman
 Nicholas Courtney as Brigadier Lethbridge-Stewart
 Elisabeth Sladen as Sarah Jane Smith

Peter Davison continues as the Doctor, accompanied by Tegan Jovanka (Janet Fielding). While Nyssa (Sarah Sutton) leaves halfway through the season in Terminus, Mark Strickson arrives as new companion Vislor Turlough in Mawdryn Undead. In the penultimate serial of the season, the shape-shifting android Kamelion (voiced by Gerald Flood) is invited aboard the TARDIS after the Doctor frees him from the Master. Kamelion accepts, though the character itself would only be seen again in Season 21's antepenultimate serial, Planet of Fire.

Past Doctors return for the 20th Anniversary special, with Patrick Troughton and Jon Pertwee appearing as the Second Doctor and Third Doctor. The First Doctor returns, played by Richard Hurndall as original actor William Hartnell died in 1975. Tom Baker was asked to return to play the Fourth Doctor but declined.

Past companions Elisabeth Sladen (Sarah Jane Smith), Nicholas Courtney (Brigadier Lethbridge-Stewart), Carole Ann Ford (Susan Foreman) return for the 20th Anniversary special, whilst Nicholas Courtney also makes an appearance in Mawdryn Undead.

Recurring actors 
 Anthony Ainley as The Master
 Valentine Dyall as the Black Guardian
 Paul Jerricho as The Castellan

Anthony Ainley returns as the Master in The King's Demons and The Five Doctors.

The Black Guardian, played by Valentine Dyall, also makes a return in Mawdryn Undead, Terminus and Enlightenment.

The Castellan, played by Paul Jerricho, appears in Arc of Infinity and reprises the role in The Five Doctors.

Guest stars
Additional companions Jamie McCrimmon (Frazer Hines), Zoe Heriot (Wendy Padbury), Liz Shaw (Caroline John) and Mike Yates (Richard Franklin) make cameos throughout the special.

David Banks makes his second of four appearances in the show in The Five Doctors as a Cyber-leader.

Colin Baker, who was subsequently cast as the Sixth Doctor, made his first appearance in Doctor Who as Commander Maxil in the season's first serial, Arc of Infinity, becoming the first actor to appear in the programme prior to taking on the role of the Doctor.

Returning villains

Returning villains for the season are Omega (Arc of Infinity), The Black Guardian (Mawdryn Undead), (Terminus), (Enlightenment), Cybermen (The Five Doctors) and The Mara (Snakedance). A lone Dalek and a lone Yeti appear briefly in The Five Doctors.

Serials 

To commemorate the twentieth season, the stories in this season involve the return of characters or villains seen in previous seasons.  This season was broadcast twice weekly on Tuesday and Wednesday evenings on BBC1.  It includes The Black Guardian Trilogy, consisting of the serials Mawdryn Undead, Terminus and Enlightenment and involving the arrival of Turlough, the departure of Nyssa and a single guest appearance from Brigadier Lethbridge-Stewart. Overall, these serials form a rough twelve-part epic.

Although The Five Doctors was broadcast more than eight months after Part 2 of The King's Demons, which was the last regular story of the season, it is usually included as part of Season 20.

Broadcast
The entire season (including the show's 20th anniversary special The Five Doctors) was broadcast from 3 January to 25 November. Transmission moved to Tuesdays and Wednesdays, except for the first episode of Arc of Infinity.

Home media

VHS releases

Betamax releases

Laserdisc releases

DVD and Blu-ray releases

In print

Notes

References

Bibliography

 

1983 British television seasons
Season 20
Season 20
20